The Amtrak Old Saybrook–Old Lyme Bridge is the last crossing of the Connecticut River before it reaches Long Island Sound. It is a Truss bridge with a bascule span, allowing boat traffic to pass through. The bridge is owned by Amtrak and used by Northeast Regional, Acela Express, Shore Line East and a few freight trains traversing the Northeast Corridor. It can be seen from the Raymond E. Baldwin Bridge (Interstate 95 and U.S. Route 1), as well as from various points on Route 154.

History

Also known as the Connecticut River Railroad Bridge and Connecticut River Bridge, it was built in 1907 by the Scherzer Rolling Lift Bridge Company of Chicago, for the New York, New Haven and Hartford Railroad. It replaced an earlier bridge, which was built in 1870 and rebuilt on the same piers in 1889. The old single-track bridge was no longer able to handle the train frequency and weights that the New Haven wished to run. Construction of the new bridge began in May 1905, and the substructure was completed in April 1906. The bridge was built with two-track spans, with the abutments long enough for a second set of spans should quadruple-tracking of the line take place. The new bridge opened on August 6, 1907.

The bridge underwent a structural rehabilitation in 1976, and had mechanical and electrical rehabilitation in 1981 and 1997. In 2000 the bridge experienced a major electrical failure which rendered the drawspan stuck in the open position (blocking railroad traffic). The bridge became stuck in the closed position twice in 2001. A 2006 inspection found the bridge to be structurally deficient and determined that periodic rehabilitation work was no longer sufficient to keep the century-old bridge functional. The bridge was determined to be eligible for listing on the National Register of Historic Places in 1987, but it was not finally listed due to owner objection.

Replacement
The structurally deficient bridge is planned for replacement. An Environmental Assessment released in May 2014 identified two preferred alternatives: a bascule bridge similar in size to the existing span, or a vertical lift bridge with possibly increased clearances. Either option would be built on a parallel alignment just south of the existing bridge. Fully high-level designs without movable sections were eliminated from consideration due to the massive approaches that would have to be built, which would have major impacts on nearby wetlands and increase construction and land acquisition costs. Construction staging plans were released in April 2020. Amtrak and ConnDOT were awarded $65.2 million in federal funds for the replacement in October 2020.

, Amtrak plans to begin the procurement process in early 2023 and award the construction contract later that year. Construction would begin in early 2024.

Notes

See also 
 List of crossings of the Connecticut River

References

External links 

 

Bridges over the Connecticut River
Railroad bridges in Connecticut
Old Lyme, Connecticut
Old Saybrook, Connecticut
Bascule bridges in the United States
Bridges completed in 1907
Bridges in Middlesex County, Connecticut
Bridges in New London County, Connecticut
New York, New Haven and Hartford Railroad bridges
Truss bridges in the United States
Steel bridges in the United States
1907 establishments in Connecticut
Northeast Corridor
Baltimore truss bridges